The 11th Alpini Regiment is an inactive regiment of the Italian Army's mountain infantry speciality, the Alpini, which distinguished itself in combat during World War I and World War II.

History

Formation 
On 22 December 1935 the 11th Alpini Regiment was formed in the city of Bruneck with existing battalions from other Alpini regiments:

  11th Alpini Regiment
  Alpini Battalion "Intra" (from the 4th Alpini Regiment)
  Alpini Battalion "Trento" (from the 2nd Alpini Regiment)
  Alpini Battalion "Saluzzo" (from the 6th Alpini Regiment)

On 1 January 1936 the regiment was subordinated to the newly created 5th Alpine Division "Pusteria" and sent with the division to Eritrea to fight in the Second Italo-Abyssinian War

Ethiopia 
For the war the Pusteria had been augmented by the "Exilles" and "Intra" battalions and four artillery batteries form the 1st Alpine Division "Taurinense". The Pusteria participated in all battles in the northern theater of the war and the 11th Alpini Regiment distinguished itself during the Battle of Amba Aradam, for which it received its first Bronze Medal of Military Valour. The division returned to the Italy in 1937 and was honored with a parade through the streets of Rome on 13 March 1937.

World War II 
After its return the regiment was reorganized, returning two battalions to their original regiments. As replacement the regiment received an existing battalion and raised another one. Thus as of 11 April 1937 the new structure of the regiment was:

  11th Alpini Regiment
  Alpini Battalion "Bolzano" (newly raised)
  Alpini Battalion "Trento"
  Alpini Battalion "Bassano" (from the 9th Alpini Regiment)

With the outbreak of World War II reserve battalions for the active battalions were formed. Named after valleys located near Bolzano, Trento, and Bassano the reserve battalions could be called up if necessary. The reserve battalions were:

  Alpini Battalion "Val Venosta" (a valley to the North of Bolzano)
  Alpini Battalion "Val Fassa" (a valley to the North of Trento)
  Alpini Battalion "Val Brenta" (a valley to the North of Bassano)

On 21 June 1940 (one day before the French surrender) the 5th Alpine Division "Pusteria" began to advance into southern France during the last days of the Battle of France.

Afterwards the 11th Alpini Regiment was sent to Albania, where it participated in the Italian attack on Greece. After the German invasion of Yugoslavia the 5th Alpine Division "Pusteria" and its units were sent to Pljevlja in Montenegro, where the division was decimated in heavy fighting during the Battle of Pljevlja, first offensive by Yugoslavian Partisans.

In August 1942 the division was repatriated, and - after two months of rest - participated in Case Anton - the Axis occupation of Vichy France. Afterwards the Pusteria took up garrison duties in southern Provence. After the announcement of the Armistice of Cassibile on 8 September 1943 part of the division surrendered to German forces in Southern France, while other units of the division managed to return to the Italian region of Piedmont were they dissolved.

1990s 
With the reintroduction of the regimental level in the Italian Army the regiment was reformed on 8 August 1992 in Bruneck as part of the Alpine Brigade "Tridentina". The regiment only consisted of the Alpini Battalion "Trento". Battalion and regiment were disbanded on 18 March 2002.

Structure 
When the regiment was disbanded it had the following structure:

  11th Alpini Regiment, in Bruneck
  Command and Logistic Support Company, in Bruneck
  Alpini Battalion "Trento", in Bruneck
  94th Alpini Company
  144th Alpini Company
  145th Alpini Company
  1128th Mortar Company

References

Sources 
 Franco dell'Uomo, Rodolfo Puletti: L'Esercito Italiano verso il 2000 - Volume Primo - Tomo I, Rome 1998, Stato Maggiore dell'Esercito - Ufficio Storico, page: 498

External links
 11th Alpini Regiment on vecio.it 

Alpini regiments of Italy
Regiments of Italy in World War I
Regiments of Italy in World War II
Military units and formations established in 1935
Military units and formations disestablished in 1943
Military units and formations established in 1992
Military units and formations disestablished in 2002